Cape Dampier is a cape on the south coast of western New Britain. It is located approximately midway between Gasmata and Jacquinot Bay. It is named for the English explorer, William Dampier.

References

Dampier